Pridvorica (Serbian Cyrillic: Придворица) is a small village in the municipality of Šavnik, Montenegro.

Demographics
According to the 2011 census, its population was 10, all but three of them Serbs.

References

Populated places in Šavnik Municipality
Serb communities in Montenegro